Kranky is an American independent record label in Chicago, Illinois. It was started in 1993 by Bruce Adams and Joel Leoschke. It houses predominantly experimental music artists, often branching into or inspired by ambient, rock, electronic or psychedelic music. Their first release was Labradford's 1993 debut album Prazision. Adams left the label in 2006, after which Leoschke continued running it, with the help of Brian Foote of Kranky band Nudge.

Artists

Current

 Ana Roxanne
 Andrew Pekler
 Anjou
 Atlas Sound
 Autistic Daughters
 Benoit Pioulard
 Belong
 Bird Show
 Boduf Songs
 Brent Gutzeit
 Brian McBride
 Charalambides
 Chihei Hatakeyama
 Chris Herbert
 Christina Vantzou
 Christopher Bissonnette
 Clear Horizon
 Cloudland Canyon
 Dawn Smithson
 Dean Roberts
 Dedekind Cut
 Demen
 Disappears
 Earthen Sea
 Ethernet
 Felix
 Forma
 Greg Davis
 Gregg Kowalsky
 Grouper
 Steve Hauschildt
 High Plains
 Implodes
 Jessica Bailiff
 Jonas Reinhardt
 Justin Walter
 Keith Fullerton Whitman
 Ken Camden
 Labradford
 Less Bells
 Lichens
 Loscil
 Lotus Plaza
 MJ Guider
 Nudge
 Tara Jane O'Neil
 Pan•American
 Raglani
 Stars of the Lid
 Strategy
 Tim Hecker
 To Kill a Petty Bourgeoisie
 Valet
 White Rainbow
 Windy & Carl
 A Winged Victory for the Sullen

Former

 Aix Em Klemm
 Amp
 Bowery Electric
 Christmas Decorations
 Dadamah
 The Dead Texan
 Deerhunter
 Dissolve
 Doldrums
 Flies Inside The Sun
 Fontanelle
 Godspeed You! Black Emperor
 Growing
 James Plotkin
 Jessamine
 Low
 Magnog
 Out Hud
 Philosopher's Stone
 Roy Montgomery
 Spiny Anteaters
 Tomorrowland

References

External links
 
 Music guide to Kranky on pontone.pl

American independent record labels
Record labels established in 1993
Alternative rock record labels
Experimental music record labels
Electronic music record labels